Mikhaylovka is a rural locality (a selo) and the administrative center of Mikhaylovsky Selsoviet, Limansky District, Astrakhan Oblast, Russia. The population was 1,165 as of 2010. There are 23 streets.

Geography 
Mikhaylovka is located 21 km northwest of Liman (the district's administrative centre) by road. Zenzeli is the nearest rural locality.

References 

Rural localities in Limansky District